Datta Tamhane or Dattatreya Balakrishna Tamhane (1912–2014), a Gandhian freedom fighter and litterateur belonging to the Marathi CKP community. He won the Maharashtra State government's award for literature and had also participated in the Salt Satyagraha and protests against the Simon Commission. As a social reformer, he helped the tribal Adivasi community for which he received the "Adivasi seva Puraskar".

References 

Marathi-language writers
Marathi people
Indian revolutionaries
Indian Hindus
Hindu reformers
Hindu nationalism
Indian nationalists
Indian social reformers
Indian independence activists from Maharashtra
20th-century Indian writers
Writers from Maharashtra